Chris Tsirgiotis is an American animator, most known for his background art pieces. He has won two Emmy Awards for Outstanding Individual Achievement: once in 2012 for his work on Secret Mountain Fort Awesome, and one in 2015 for his work on Tome of the Unknown (the pilot episode to the critically lauded animated miniseries Over the Garden Wall).

Accolades
Tsirgiotis received the Primetime Emmy Award for Outstanding Individual Achievement in Animation in 2012, 2015, and 2016; Tsirgiotis also won an Emmy of the same name at the inaugural Children's and Family Emmy Awards ceremony held in 2022.

Filmography

References

External links
 
 

Living people
American animators
Emmy Award winners
Year of birth missing (living people)
Pratt Institute alumni
Place of birth missing (living people)
Cartoon Network Studios people